A-10 Cuba! is a flight simulator computer game developed by Parsoft Interactive and published by Activision in 1996 for Windows and Mac. The game was a sequel to the Mac-exclusive A-10 Attack!. A third game in the series, titled A-10 Gulf!, was slated for release in 1997 but later cancelled.

Gameplay
It features an A-10 Thunderbolt II on a mission to defeat guerrilla forces at Guantánamo Bay, Cuba. As in most war flight simulator games, the main objectives contain defending an airbase, destroying ships, bridges, tanks or buildings and escorting other aircraft.

A-10 Cuba! was the long-awaited sequel to the original A-10 Attack! flight simulator. A-10 Cuba! had the same impressive flight model as its predecessor, except the graphics had become significantly more detailed and thus required a computer with a bit more power. Graphical and other improvements included tire smoke when landing or skidding, runway taxi-way lighting, the Air Combat Command insignia on most U.S. aircraft, increased number of polygons (making objects appear much more round than they appeared in A-10 Attack!), and weapon damage was significantly upgraded (increased realism) and ground vehicle physics were more realistic. However, the Windows version lacked the comprehensive mission editor and map view available in both the Macintosh version and in A-10 Attack!.

A-10 Cuba! has four practice levels, Take off, Landing, Air to Ground, and Air to Air. Each training level takes place in the desert area of the game.

Reception

The game received mixed reviews upon release. Its simple but high performing graphics were praised while its documentation and features were found lacking. Macworlds Michael Gowan wrote that the game features "the best flight modeling of any Mac flight sim". Although he found the game somewhat inferior to F/A-18 Korea, he summarized that A-10 Cuba! "offers great game play, varied missions, and rough-and-tumble network play."

See also
A-10 Tank Killer (1989/90)
A-10 Attack! (1995)
Silent Thunder: A-10 Tank Killer II (1996)

References

External links

A-10 Cuba! Review

1996 video games
Combat flight simulators
Windows games
Classic Mac OS games
Video games set in Cuba
Cold War video games
Multiplayer and single-player video games
Video games developed in the United States